The 2015 Stoke-on-Trent City Council election took place on 7 May 2015 to elect members of Stoke-on-Trent City Council in England. This was on the same day as other local elections and the general election.

Election result
After the election, results were as follows: Labour 21, Independent 14, Conservative 7, UKIP 2. The Labour Party lost 14 seats, with gains for the Conservatives, Independent candidates and UKIP.

|- style="background-color:#F6F6F6"
| colspan="7" style="text-align: right; margin-right: 0.5em" | Turnout
| style="text-align: right; margin-right: 0.5em" | 
| style="text-align: right; margin-right: 0.5em" |126221
| style="text-align: right; margin-right: 0.5em" |+61364
|-

Ward results

Abbey Hulton and Townsend

Baddeley, Milton and Norton

Bentilee and Ubberley

Birches Head and Central Forest Park

Blurton East

Blurton West and Newstead

Boothen and Oakhill

Bradeley and Chell Heath

Broadway and Longton East

Burslem Central

Burslem Park

Dresden and Florence

Eaton Park

Etruria and Hanley

Fenton East

Fenton West and Mount Pleasant

Ford Green and Smallthorne

Goldenhill and Sandyford

Great Chell and Packmoor

Hanford and Trentham

Hanley Park and Shelton

Hartshill and Basford

Hollybush and Longton West

Joiners Square

Lightwood North and Normacot

Little Chell and Stanfield

Meir Hay

Meir North

Meir Park

Meir South

Moorcroft

Penkhull and Stoke

Sandford Hill

Sneyd Green

Springfields and Trent Vale

Tunstall

Weston Coyney

References

2015 English local elections
May 2015 events in the United Kingdom
2015
2010s in Staffordshire